Earth Jones is a jazz album by drummer Elvin Jones recorded in 1982 and released on the Palo Alto label.

Reception
The Allmusic review states "The solos are unpredictable but logical, and the blend between the lyrical Hino and Liebman is appealing".

Track listing
 "Three Card Molly" (Elvin Jones) - 8:03 
 "Is Seeing Believing?" (Dave Liebman) - 7:58 
 "The Top of the Middle" (Liebman) - 3:56 
 "Earth Jones" (Liebman) - 7:07 
 "Never Let Me Go" (Ray Evans, Jay Livingston) - 7:27 
 "Day and Night" (Liebman) - 7:46

Personnel
Elvin Jones  - drums 
Terumasa Hino - cornet
Dave Liebman - soprano saxophone, flute
Kenny Kirkland - piano, electric piano
George Mraz - bass

References

1982 albums
Elvin Jones albums
Palo Alto Records albums
Albums recorded at Van Gelder Studio